Wąwał  is a village in the administrative district of Gmina Tomaszów Mazowiecki, within Tomaszów Mazowiecki County, Łódź Voivodeship, in central Poland.

The village has an approximate population of 700.

References

Villages in Tomaszów Mazowiecki County